There have been two baronetcies created for members of the Jessel family, both in the Baronetage of the United Kingdom. One creation is extant as of 2012.

The Jessel Baronetcy, of Ladham House in the parish of Goudhurst in the County of Kent, was created in the Baronetage of the United Kingdom on 25 May 1883 for Charles Jessel, in honour of his father, the prominent lawyer and judge Sir George Jessel, Master of the Rolls from 1873 to 1883. The first Baronet was later High Sheriff of Kent in 1903.

The Jessel Baronetcy, of Westminster in the County of London, was created in the Baronetage of the United Kingdom in 1917 for the politician Herbert Jessel, second son of Sir George Jessel and younger brother of the first Baronet of the 1883 creation. He was elevated to the peerage as Baron Jessel in 1924 (see this title for more information).

Jessel baronets, of Ladham (1883)
 
Sir Charles James Jessel, 1st Baronet (1860–1928)
Sir George Jessel, 2nd Baronet (1891–1977)
Sir Charles John Jessel, 3rd Baronet (1924–2022)
Sir George Elphinstone Jessel, 4th Baronet (born 1957)

The heir apparent is the current holder's son, Charles Jack Jessel (born 2000)

Jessel baronets, of Westminster (1917)
see Baron Jessel

Notes

References
Kidd, Charles, Williamson, David (editors). Debrett's Peerage and Baronetage (1990 edition). New York: St Martin's Press, 2000, p.B572

Baronetcies in the Baronetage of the United Kingdom
Extinct baronetcies in the Baronetage of the United Kingdom